Ghiath Tayfour (in Arabic غياث طيفور‎ 1969 – 11 March 2012) was a Syrian boxing champion in Syria and winner of many titles including Syrian championship titles from 1984 to 1998. He was born in Aleppo, Syria, and began his training with the Police Club of Aleppo.

Tayfour was assassinated in front of the University of Aleppo.  Opposition forces to the government of Bashar Assad claimed responsibility for his murder, alleging "his involvement in the government's security apparatus against the protesters during Syrian Civil War". He had reportedly received death threats earlier.  At the time of his death, Tayfour was an administrator in the Department of Sports Facilities in Aleppo, Syria. He was also a member of the Syrian Boxing Federation and a boxing trainer in the Aleppo Police Club, where he first learned to box.

Medals
 1990 - Bronze at the Istanbul International Tournament 
 1991 - Gold at the Mediterranean Championships
 1992 - Gold at the 10th Arab Championships
 1993 - Silver at the Slovakian Tournament 
 1995 - Gold at Egypt International Tournament
 1995 - Bronze at the Arab Championships
 1996 - Bronze at the Dagestan Tournament
 1997 - Silver at the Dagestan Tournament
 1997 - Silver at the Bosphorus International Tournament
 1993 - Bronze Mediterranean Championships in France
 1994 - Bronze in Asian Games
 1997 - Bronze at the Iranian International Tournament
 1999 - Gold at the King Hussein Tournament in Jordan
 1999 - Gold at the Istanbul International Tournament
 1999 - Gold at the Iranian International Tournament

References

1969 births
2012 deaths
Asian Games medalists in boxing
Assassinated Syrian people
Boxers at the 1994 Asian Games
Deaths by firearm in Syria
Male murder victims
Sportspeople from Aleppo
People murdered in Syria
Terrorism deaths in Syria
Syrian male boxers
Asian Games bronze medalists for Syria
Mediterranean Games gold medalists for Syria
Mediterranean Games bronze medalists for Syria
Competitors at the 1991 Mediterranean Games
Competitors at the 1993 Mediterranean Games
Medalists at the 1994 Asian Games
Mediterranean Games medalists in boxing
Light-middleweight boxers
20th-century Syrian people